William Nowland Van Powell (1904–1977), sometimes known professionally as William Van Powell or Nowland Van Powell was an architect, painter, and historian from Memphis, Tennessee.

Architect
In the 1930s, the Greyhound Lines bus company built many bus stations in the then-popular Streamline Moderne style. William Nowland Van Powell designed at least four of them. Working with George Mahan, Jr. in 1939, he was the architect of the Greyhound Bus Station in Jackson, Mississippi. Working with Ben Watson White, he designed the Blytheville Greyhound Bus Station in 1937.

He is also credited as the designer of two nearly-identical Greyhound Half-Way Stations: the Greyhound Half-Way House in Waverly, Tennessee, that has been preserved, and another in Flat River, Missouri that has been substantially remodeled into a laundromat.

Van Powell worked in other architectural styles for other clients. In 1927, he was the architect of the Venetian-inspired Memphis Steam Laundry building, formerly at 941 Jefferson Ave., Memphis, demolished in 2009.

Along with Henry Ehrensing, he was the architect of the Grand Palace Hotel, New Orleans (built originally as Claiborne Towers), and promoted by its developer as "likely to be one of the greatest buildings the South has ever seen." At the time, Claiborne Towers was the South's largest apartment project, with a planned 1036 units that included air conditioning.

He was also the architect of Memphis' Farnsworth Building (now the Memphis Business Journal Building), which was added to the National Register of Historic Places in 1983.

Buildings designed

Painter, Historian, Author
Van Powell was the author of The American Navies of the Revolutionary War, a collection of his paintings, with descriptive notes by the artist published in 1974 by G. P. Putnam's Sons, New York.

References

1904 births
1977 deaths
Architects from Tennessee
Art Deco architects
American marine artists
Streamline Moderne architects